Rachael or Rachel Bell may refer to:

Rachael Bell, political candidate in East Riding of Yorkshire Council election, 2011
Rachel Bell (born 1950), British actress

See also
Rachael Bella (born 1984), American actress